Mathias Sorgho (born 11 September 1987) is a Burkinabé road cyclist.

Major results

2015
 1st Overall Tour du Bénin
1st Stage 2
 3rd Overall Tour du Faso
2016
 1st Overall Tour du Togo
1st Stage 2
 1st Overall Tour du Bénin
 1st Stage 1 Tour du Faso
 2nd Road race, National Road Championships
2017
 1st  Road race, National Road Championships
 2nd Overall Tour du Bénin
1st Stage 1
 3rd Overall Tour du Faso
2018
 1st Overall  Tour du Faso
1st Stage 4
 3rd Overall Tour de Côte d'Ivoire
 3rd Overall Tour of the Democratic Republic of the Congo
1st Stage 5
2019
 1st Stage 2 Tour du Faso
 1st Stage 3 Tour of the Democratic Republic of the Congo
 2nd Overall Tour de Côte d'Ivoire
1st Stage 7
 10th Road race, African Road Championships
2020
 9th Overall Grand Prix Chantal Biya

References

1987 births
Living people
Burkinabé male cyclists
21st-century Burkinabé people